Anna Wishink (born 28 March 1989 in Hobart, Tasmania) is an Australian professional tennis player. Her highest WTA singles ranking is 495, which she reached on 9 February 2009. Her career high in doubles is 472, which she reached on 9 February 2009.

ITF Circuit finals

Singles finals 1 (0–1)

External links
 
 
 

1989 births
Living people
Australian female tennis players
Sportspeople from Hobart
Tennis people from Tasmania
Sportswomen from Tasmania